A tanning agent is used for:
 Leather tanning, the process of treating skins and hides of animals to produce leather
 Sunless tanning, the effect of a suntan without the Sun
 Tanning activator, chemicals that increase the effect of UV-radiation on human skin